This lists ranks the tallest completed and topped out buildings in Italy that stand at least  tall, based on standard height measurement. This includes spires and architectural details but does not include antenna masts. Only habitable building are ranked which excludes radio masts and towers, observation towers, steeples, chimneys and other tall architectural structures.

Overview
Even though it is well known for famous ancient structures, Italy curiously played a key role as precursor in the construction of the first modern skyscrapers in Europe. The history of skyscrapers in Italy began with the completion of Torrione INA in Brescia. The tower is 57 m (187 ft) high and was completed in 1932. Torre Piacentini (63 m) in Genoa was the tallest high rise building in Europe from 1940 to 1952 as well as the first one whose roof reached and exceeded the height of 100 metres. After 1952, Italy lost the record in Europe but it continued to have the tallest buildings in the European Union until 1966, with three different skyscrapers: Torre Breda (117 m), Grattacielo di Cesenatico (118 m)  and Pirelli Tower (127 m). 

Italy's first business district, the Centro Direzionale, opened in 1994 in Naples. Today, there are 2 business districts in Italy, after Milan's opened in 2009. The construction of high rise buildings was interrupted in the 1970s and 1980s, and restarted from 1990 onwards, mainly in Naples and Milan, but also in Rome, Genoa and Turin. Nevertheless, only Milan and Naples have developed a skyline of high-rise buildings and skyscrapers in their city centres.

Tallest completed and topped out buildings
This list includes the +100 m tallest completed and topped out buildings in the country. Official heights include spires but exclude communications masts and antennae.

Timeline of tallest buildings

Buildings under construction

Approved or proposed buildings

See also

List of tallest buildings in Europe
List of tallest structures in Italy
List of tallest buildings in Rome
List of tallest buildings in Naples
List of tallest buildings in Bologna
List of tallest buildings in Milan
List of tallest buildings in Genoa

References